Herbert Hindelang (born 18 December 1940) is a German biathlete. He competed in the 20 km individual event at the 1968 Winter Olympics.

References

External links
 

1940 births
Living people
German male biathletes
Olympic biathletes of West Germany
Biathletes at the 1968 Winter Olympics
People from Lörrach (district)
Sportspeople from Freiburg (region)